St. Johnston (or St. Johnston Village) is a settlement in the northwest of the island of Antigua. It lies to the east of the capital, St. John's, of which is virtually a suburb. Potters Village lies immediately to the southeast. It was named for the Governor General of the Leeward Islands, Sir Thomas Reginald St. Johnston who built a hospital there.

Demographics

Enumeration Districts 
St. Johnston has two enumeration districts. It is considered a part of St. John's City.

 15700 St. Johnsons Village
 15800 St. Johnsons East

2011 Population and Housing Census

References

Sources
Miller, D. (ed.) (2005) Caribbean Islands. (4th edition). Footscray, VIC: Lonely Planet.
Scott, C. R. (ed.) (2005) Insight guide: Caribbean (5th edition). London: Apa Publications.

Populated places in Antigua and Barbuda
Saint John Parish, Antigua and Barbuda